Neil Ieremia, ONZM, is one of New Zealand’s most accomplished choreographers, a creative entrepreneur and inspirational leader. He is the founder, artistic director and chief executive of internationally acclaimed contemporary dance company, Black Grace.

Early Years
Born and bred in Cannons Creek, Porirua, and of Samoan descent, Neil Ieremia was raised in a tough working-class neighbourhood located to the North East of Wellington. At the age of six, Ieremia was struck with rheumatic fever which damaged his heart, and meant he couldn't play sports with his friends. That was difficult for a Pacific Island boy living in one of the country's poorest suburbs where boys were expected to be sporty and tough. In this world, Ieremia found solace in dance. Ieremia was thirteen when he choreographed his first group dance for a church youth concert. He really enjoyed the sense of freedom and expression that he was able to experience during that performance and from then on he continued to choreograph and dance

Ieremia’s first introduction to professional dance and dancers was when he got a job on a choreographic team that participated in the Commonwealth Games in Auckland in 1990. From this experience Ieremia was invited to attend the Auckland Performing Arts School that was being established that year. At nineteen, and with no formal training, Ieremia left his job working in a bank and packed up his life in Porirua to move to Auckland. This is where he experienced his first ballet and contemporary classes. In his final year at the Auckland Performing Arts School, Ieremia joined the acclaimed Douglas Wright Dance Company and performed in the major works Gloria, A Far Cry, Forever, How on Earth and Buried Venus. He subsequently worked with many of New Zealand's leading choreographers.

Career
Motivated to provide a different perspective and a fresh voice in the dance scene, Ieremia founded his own company, Black Grace, in 1995, with ten male dancers of Pacific, Maori and New Zealand heritage. Since then he has changed the face of contemporary dance in New Zealand and turned Black Grace into one of the most recognizable and iconic cultural brands. Ieremia draws from his Samoan and New Zealand roots to create innovative dance works that reach across social, cultural and generational barriers. The work itself is highly physical, rich in the storytelling traditions of the South Pacific and expressed with raw finesse, unique beauty and power.

Ieremia’s creative concepts are wide-ranging, from something as simple as creating movement to a favourite piece of music, right through to works exploring abuse, colonization and racism.  He has also developed a number of different initiatives, which aim to further diversity audiences both nationally and internationally, as well as offer professional development to Company members and opportunities to community groups.

Ieremia has had numerous ‘firsts’ for a New Zealand choreographer including sell-out performances at Jacob’s Pillow Dance Festival (USA debut 2004 and 2005), a four-week season on New York City’s 42nd Street, performances at the renowned Cervantino Festival in Mexico, the John F. Kennedy Center for the Performing Arts, and the 2010 Cultural Olympiad in Vancouver.

Ieremia has also choreographed work for the Royal New Zealand Ballet, the New Zealand Symphony Orchestra, Opera New Zealand, New Zealand Wearable Arts and the Holland Dance Festival. 

In 2018 he authored a children's book, Elephantic, and founded and directed a free festival for Pacific artists, The Guerrilla Collection.

Awards and Honors
In 2003, Neil Ieremia was nominated for the prestigious international Rolex Mentor and Protégé Arts Initiative. In 2005, The Arts Foundation of New Zealand made him an Arts Laureate, and in 2009 he received the Paul D. Fleck Fellowship in the Arts from The Banff Centre, Canada. In 2009, the Guam Legislature passed a resolution in recognition of Black Grace’s work with local communities there, and in 2010 the Mayor of Honolulu officially proclaimed 6 February 2010 as “Black Grace Day”. The Company received a Herald Angel Award at the 2014 Edinburgh Festival Fringe.  In 2015, Ieremia received a City of Porirua Anniversary Award and the Senior Pacific Artist Award from Creative New Zealand. In 2016, he was appointed an Officer of the New Zealand Order of Merit for services to dance and in 2021, he was a recipient of a Kea World Class Award, and was inducted into the Porirua Hall of Fame. In 2022 Neil Ieremia and Black Grace received the inaugural Moana Creative Enterprise Award at the 2022 Pacific Business Trust Awards.

Filmography
-	2005 From Cannon’s Creek to Jacob’s Pillow. Documentary - Aileen O'Sullivan's and Toby Mills

-	2013 Mother Mother. Music Video - Fat Freddy’s Drop

-	2021 Elephantic. Dance film based on the book Elephantic authored by Neil Ieremia and illustrated by Pati Fuiava.

Publications feat Neil Ieremia
-	2006, Insights, New Zealand artists talk about creativity by Gareth Shute

-	2008, Dance:  The Illustrated History of Dance in New Zealand by Tara Jahn-Werner

-	2012, The Power of Us, New Zealanders who dare to dream by Sir Ray Avery, Cameron Bennet & Adrian Malloch

-	2017, Leaders Like You, New Zealand leaders share stories of courage, failure and commitment, by Nick Sceats and Andrea Thompson

-	2018, Oh Boy, A storybook of Epic NZ Men, by Stuart Lipshaw

-	2021, The Reading Tribe by David Riley

References

Acquista, C. (2019, October).
Neil Ieremia: The Grace of Resilience. Dance ICONS. Retrieved from http://www.danceicons.org/pages/?p=190927091519 

Catherall, S. (2016, June 09)
Neil Ieremia: A man full of grace. Stuff. Retrieved from https://www.stuff.co.nz/entertainment/stage-and-theatre/80819486/neil-ieremia-a-man-full-of-grace 

Husband, D. (2018, May 13)
Neil Ieremia: Telling  our stories through dance, E. Tangata. Retrieved from https://e-tangata.co.nz/korero/neil-ieremia-telling-our-stories-through-dance/  

Neil (n.d). The What Dance Can Do Project. Retrieved from
https://thewhatdancecandoproject.com/portfolio/neil/ 

Neil Ieremia. (n.d). The Arts Foundation. Retrieved from https://www.thearts.co.nz/artists/neil-ieremia

External links
 Black Grace website
 Listener magazine – Interview
 PBS article online
 NZ Herald article 2009
 Boston News interview 2004
 TVNZ Black Grace documentary

Samoan artists
New Zealand choreographers
Living people
People from Wellington City
Officers of the New Zealand Order of Merit
Year of birth missing (living people)